The following is a summary of the Hubro Music albums. Hubro Music is a Norwegian record label dedicated to releasing music from the Norwegian jazz and improvised music scene, and is a label under the Grappa parent label.

References

External links 
 

Discographies of Norwegian record labels